Pedro Eustache (born August 18, 1959) is a Venezuelan-born flautist, reed player, world woodwind player, composer, and instrument maker and collector.

Education
Venezuelan-born Eustache studied first in Venezuela under Michel Eustache (his brother), Ernesto Santini, Antonio Jose Naranjo and Glenn Egner while a member of José Antonio Abreu's "Venezuelan Youth National Orchestra" (now known as El Sistema). Upon graduation, he received a scholarship from the Venezuelan government to study in Europe, at the Hector Berlioz Conservatoire and L'Ècole de Musique d'Asnières, with Raymond Guiot & Pierre-Yves Artaud, respectively, with advanced studies with  Aurèle Nicolet in Basel, Switzerland.  He also has a M.F.A. in jazz from the California Institute of the Arts, U.S.

Eustache is a devout Christian.

Career
In February 2009, Eustache premiered his composition  "Suite Concertante for World Woodwinds & Symphony Orchestra"]. Eustache  performed on 21 solo woodwind instruments, under the baton of his fellow-countryman Gustavo Dudamel, with his "Orquesta Sinfónica Simón Bolívar", Caracas, Venezuela.

Eustache performed a "Multidirectional Flute" solo concert at the Conservatoire National Supérieure de Musique et Danse de Paris-France. He was the opening soloist of the 3rd. International Spanish Flute Convention "Gala concert" in Seville 2014.

Eustache was a featured soloist with the wind ensemble of Samford University, under the baton of soloist and conductor Demondrae Thurman, Birmingham Alabama, Oct. 2014. In 2008 and 2015 he gave solo concerts in Beirut, Lebanon, at the  "Palais de L'UNESCO", under the aegis of the Mid. Eastern Bible Society [Lebanon], directed by Dr. Michel Bassous, and was one of the guests soloists invited by the Armenian government and Garik Israelian for the 6-hour long '80 years Anniversary Tribute-Concert' in Yerevan-Armenia.

He has also performed and/or recorded as a featured soloist with the Orchestra dell'Accademia Nazionale di Santa Cecilia, L'Orchestre Symphonique Du Bal de Vienne, Orquesta Sinfónica Simón Bolívar [principal solo flute "chair" for three years], London Symphony Orchestra, Prague Symphony Orchestra, Venezuela Symphony Orchestra [first flute chair for two years], and the Caracas Symphonietta.

Film scores
Eustache has often provided solo woodwind for recording sessions in Los Angeles. He has done studio sessions for movies as a flute/woodwinds instrumentalist, including being the main world woodwinds soloist for Mel Gibson's The Passion of the Christ soundtrack, written by John Debney.

He won the 2007 Film & TV Music Award for Best Instrumental Performance by a Soloist in a Film or Television Score category for his work in Hans Zimmer's Pirates of the Caribbean: At World's End.

He played Middle-Eastern flutes, reeds and Armenian duduk featured in Steven Spielberg's Munich (nominated for both the 2006 Oscars and the 49th Grammy Awards for "Best Soundtrack"), composed and conducted by John Williams, as well as King Kenacho & Bs. Persian Ney in "Indiana Jones and the Kingdom of the Crystal Skull".  He also soloed extensively in Middle-Eastern woodwinds & duduk with the London Symphony Orchestra for the film, The Body.

He worked with Hans Zimmer on the woodwinds music for the film Dune in 2021.

Collaborations
Eustache's world flutes and woodwinds solos are featured with Paul McCartney on his song "Jenny Wren", and "Growing Up Falling Down" which appears on the single Fine Line. For ten years he was the principal flute of Yanni Orchestra. He later performed on McCartney's 2018 album, Egypt Station. He was a featured soloist in the 2005 Grammy-award winner "Concert For George".

He collaborated on 2014 Persian traditional music album Beyond Any Form.

Other performances

Eustache was the featured winds soloist on Ramin Djawadi's/HBO's "Game of Thrones - Live Music Experience" international tour of 2017. In 2017 he was also the featured solo wind soloist in "Hans Zimmer Live" world tour.

Eustache was a featured performer South-American woodwinds, Afro-Venezuelan percussion] on Gustavo Dudamel's "Libertador" orchestral suite, with the Los Angeles Philharmonic at the Hollywood Bowl in the "Noche de Cine" concert special, July 30, 2014. He has been the woodwinds featured soloist with Yanni's orchestra since 1995, most recently during the 2003-2004 Ethnicity and 2005 Yanni Live! tours. He is the featured flute, sax & world winds soloist with Persian-pop diva Googoosh.

Eustache was brass section leader (tenor saxophone), for the Inside Job U.S. West-Coast tour for Don Henley.  He was also house band member for Edward James Olmos' Americanos Concert with Latin Superstars Cachao Lopez, Gloria Estefan, Paquito D'Rivera, José Feliciano, Juan Luis Guerra, Sheila E., held at the Kennedy Center, Washington D.C., for the PBS Presents series. With the ORF Radio Symphony Orchestra he played flute and cuatro at the Hollywood in Vienna 2018 dedicated to Hans Zimmer score film music.

Eustache partook in The Game Awards 2022, performing along with the Game Awards Orchestra before the Game of the Year was announced. His enthusiastic performance and seamless transitions between several wind instruments were immediately noted by viewers, most notably during the Xenoblade Chronicles 3 section of the Orchestra's medley, who kept the hashtag #FluteGuy trending on Twitter throughout the night and were regarded by many as the highlight of the entire awards show.

Teaching
In October 2014 he was an artist-in-residence at Samford University, teaching master-classes in music fundamentals, musical aesthetics, western classical performance, jazz improvisation, and world music winds.

Eustache has also taught Classical western flute in the Venezuelan National Youth Symphony's Conservatory, the Children's Orchestra Conservatory; Jazz flute in 1993–95 at the California Institute of the Arts, & more recently [in 2008], in a renewed connection with his native country, "Introduction to Music Technology", "Improvisation for Non-Improvisers" Parts I & II & "World Music I: Introduction to The Classical Music of North India" [extension courses] at the Instituto Universitario de Estudios Musicales.

Discography
As a Soloist:
Hymns Of Yesterday & Today (2007)
Global Mvission (2004)
The Giant Sleeps (1995)
Strive for Higher Realities (1993)

References

Bio at Lian Records
Profile at Reflections an Unofficial Yanni fan page
As a featured guest-soloist for Jivan Gasparyan's 80th birthday Concert Julilee

External links

Official site
Pedro Eustache at the CNSM-Paris, France 
Pedro Eustache at Samford University-Birmingham, Alabama, USA 

1959 births
Living people
Venezuelan composers
Male composers
Venezuelan multi-instrumentalists
Venezuelan flautists